Giovanni Patrone (Naples, March 17, 1847 - ?) was an Italian painter of figures, in both oil and watercolor.

Biography
He studied painting and won many awards at the Royal Institute of Fine Arts of Naples under Domenico Morelli and Filippo Palizzi. He became professor of design. At the Promotrice of Naples, he exhibited: Un momento di riposo: Mezza figura al vero; Fanciulla; and Vecchiaia.

References

1847 births
19th-century Italian painters
Italian male painters
Painters from Naples
Year of death missing
19th-century Italian male artists